The 1928 Creighton Bluejays football team was an American football team that represented Creighton University as a member of the Missouri Valley Conference (MVC) during the 1928 college football season. In its sixth season under head coach Chet A. Wynne, the team compiled a 3–5–1 record (2–1 against MVC opponents) and was outscored by a total of 128 to 86. The team played its home games at Creighton Stadium in Omaha, Nebraska.

Schedule

References

Creighton
Creighton Bluejays football seasons
Creighton Bluejays football